GiroLive-Ballers Osnabrück was a basketball club based in Osnabrück, Lower Saxony, Germany. The team played in Germany's second division Pro A until March 2011, when the club's licence was detracted by the league. Their home games were played at KiKxxlarena.

Notable players
 Jevohn Shepherd
 Ty Harrelson
 Steve Wachalski

See also
 GiroLive Panthers Osnabrück

References

Basketball teams established in 1965
Defunct basketball teams in Germany
Sport in Lower Saxony
Sport in Osnabrück
Basketball teams disestablished in 2011